Cosmophasis baehrae is a species of jumping spider found in Australia.
It is named after entomologist Barbara Baehr.

Description
Cosmophasis baehrae has the inner two forward looking eyes greatly enlarged, typical of the jumping spider family, Salticidae. Diagnostic for this species is a white bar on the carapace just behind the rearmost pair of eyes.

Distribution
Cosmophasis baehrae is found along northern coastal regions of Australia from Brisbane in the east to Western Australia.

Gallery

References

Salticidae
Spiders of Australia
Spiders described in 2012